Michelle Paress is an American actress. She starred in the HBO program The Wire as reporter Alma Gutierrez; Paress joined the cast in the show's fifth season. She was married to a former star of the show, actor Lawrence Gilliard Jr. The couple divorced in November of 2020.

References

External links

American television actresses
Living people
Place of birth missing (living people)
Year of birth missing (living people)
21st-century American actresses